is a Japanese peace researcher and sociologist specialized in the research of non-violent peace activism, study on Survivors of Hiroshima and Nagasaki, refugee issues, foreign workers, and peace-building. He is a current Secretary-General of International Peace Research Association, former professor and vice president at Mie University, Japan and former vice president of International Social Science Council at UNESCO.

Early life, education and career 
Born as a son of a survivor of the atomic bombing of Hiroshima in 1959 in Akitakata, Hiroshima, Kodama has dedicated his research on peacebuilding and non-violent peace activism. He received a master's degree in Sociology from Hiroshima University in 1984. His research theme was life history of "Atomic Orphans" who lost their parents by atomic bombing of Hiroshima. After receiving a Ph.D in Sociology from Lund University of Sweden in 1990 for his research on non-violent peace movements, he began his career at Mie University as Assistant Professor of Faculty of Humanities and Social Sciences in Japan. Later he was promoted to Associate Professor in 1992 and further promoted to Professor in 2004 and the vice president in 2011. He is an author of various books on peace-building and sociology.

He served as Secretary-General of International Peace Research Association (IPRA) from 2000 to 2004, and 2010 to 2012 and vice president of International Social Science Council (ISSC) at UNESCO from 2006 to 2010. He was again elected as Secretary-General of IPRA for 2016 – 2020 at the IPRA Administrative Meeting held in Sierra Leonne in 2016. He received Anuvrat Ahimsa (non-violence) International Peace Award from ANUVRAT Global Organization, India in 2012.

He is currently assigned as a professor at Swarnim Startup & Innovation University (SSIU), India, and visiting scholar at International Research Institute of Aichi University, Japan, Sakarya University, Turkey, Tribhuvan University, Nepal and Malir University of Science & Technology, Pakistan.

He is the founder of UBrainTV Co., Ltd., an Internet television company founded in 2013 in Nagoya, Japan.

References

External links

Japanese sociologists
Hiroshima University alumni
People from Hiroshima Prefecture
Living people
1959 births